Shamina or Shah mina (Persian for "emperor's wool") refers to a type of shawl made from Cashmere wool in South Asia.

References

Woven fabrics